The Congress on the French Language in Canada (French: Congrès de la langue française au Canada) was a scientific convention that met on three occasions, in 1912, 1937 and 1952, to discuss the situation of the French language in Canada (and generally in North America) and find solutions to ensure its survival. A fourth Congress entirely devoted to the refrancization of Quebec was held in 1957.

First Congress (June 24 to June 30, 1912) 

The First Congress on the French Language in Canada (Premier Congrès de la langue française au Canada)  was held at Université Laval in Quebec City from June 24 to June 30, 1912. Its stated objective was to "examine the questions raised by the defence, the culture and the development of the French language and literature in  Canada."

Second Congress (June 27 to July 1st, 1937) 

The Second Congress on the French Language in Canada (Deuxième Congrès de la langue française au Canada) was held at Université Laval in Quebec City from June 27 to 1 July 1937. The theme of the second congress was "The French spirit in Canada, in our language, our laws, our habits" (L'esprit français au Canada, dans notre langue, dans nos lois, dans nos mœurs).

Third Congress (June 18 to June 26, 1952) 

The Third Congress on the French Language in Canada (Troisième Congrès de la langue française au Canada) was held in Quebec City, Montreal and Saint-Hyacinthe, from June 18 to June 26, 1952. The theme of this third congress was "Let us preserve our cultural heritage" (Conservons notre héritage culturel).

Refrancization Congress (June 21 to June 24, 1957) 

The Refrancization Congress (Congrès de la refrancisation) was held at Université Laval in Quebec City from June 21 to June 24, 1957.

Notes

References 

 Bélanger, Michel (2009). "Histoire de l'interventionnisme de l'État dans le domaine linguistique", in the site of the Société Saint-Jean-Baptiste de la Mauricie, 2009
 Martel, Marcel (1997). Le deuil d'un pays imaginé: rêves, luttes et déroute du Canada français : les rapports entre le Québec et la francophonie canadienne, 1867-1975, Ottawa: Presses de l'Université d'Ottawa, 203 p.  (preview)
 Congrès de la refrancisation (1959). Le Congrès de la refrancisation, Québec, 21-24 juin 1957, Québec: les Éditions Ferland, 3 volumes
 Congrès de la refrancisation (1957?). Vœux adoptés par le Congrès de la refrancisation, Québec: le Conseil de la vie française, 1957?, 12 p.
 CLFC (1952). Troisième congrès de la langue française, 18-25 juin 1952 : remerciements et vœux du président, Québec: Éditions Ferland, volume 1, 26 p.
 CLFC (1952). Troisième congrès de la langue française, 18-25 juin 1952 : compte-rendu, Québec: Éditions Ferland, volume 2, 475 p.
 CLFC (1952). Troisième congrès de la langue française, 18-25 juin 1952 : photographies, Québec: Éditions Ferland, volume 3, 64 p.
 CLFC (1952). Troisième congrès de la langue française, 18-25 juin 1952 : Mémoires, Québec: Éditions Ferland, volume 4, 390 p.
 CLFC (1938). Deuxième congrès de la langue française au Canada, Québec, 27 juin-1er juillet 1937 : compte rendu, Québec: Imprimerie de l'Action catholique, 529 p.
 CLFC (1938). Deuxième congrès de la langue française au Canada, Québec, 27 juin-1st juillet 1937 : mémoires, Québec: Le Soleil, 3 volumes
 CLFC (1937?). Deuxième Congrès de la langue française au Canada : vœux adoptés par les sections d'étude, Québec: le Comité permanent des congrès de la langue française en Amérique, Université Laval, 18 p.
 CLFC (1937?). Deuxième Congrès de la langue française au Canada, Québec, 1937 : programme, Québec: le Comité permanent des congrès de la langue française en Amérique, Université Laval, 47 p.
 CLFC (1914). Premier Congrès de la langue française au Canada. Québec, 24-30 juin, 1912. Mémoires, Québec: Imprimerie de l'Action sociale, 636 p. (online)
 CLFC (1913). Premier Congrès de la langue française au Canada. Québec, 24-30 juin, 1912. Compte rendu, Québec: Imprimerie de l'Action sociale, 693 p. (online)
 CLFC (1912). Album souvenir : le Congrès de la langue française au Canada et le IIIe Centenaire de Québec, 1608-1908, Québec: Le Soleil, 126 p. (online)
 CLFC (1912?). Premier congrès de la langue française au Canada : déclarations et vœux, Québec : Le Comité permanent du congrès de la langue française au Canada, Université Laval, 29 p.
 CLFC (1912?). Premier congrès de la langue française au Canada : Guide du congressiste, Québec: s.n., 96 p.

Quebec French
French language in the United States
Acadia
French Canada
Organisation internationale de la Francophonie